Armored Core V is a mecha-based video game developed by FromSoftware and published by Namco Bandai Games for PlayStation 3 and Xbox 360. It is the 14th main installment in the Armored Core series and a return to the more traditional style of gameplay found in the original series of games.

Gameplay
Whereas previous games in the series focused on quick-reflex combat, Armored Core V relies heavily on tactical gameplay. Similar to the first games in the series, Armored Core V requires players to use level geography to their advantage.

Two features are added to the series, with the first being the introduction of "OVERED Weapons" (also known as "Ultimate Weapons" in the Japanese release), back-mounted weapon parts which deals enormous damage that can annihilate opponents, but these weapons requires to store all weapons currently equipped in the AC's arms and shoulder to fully utilize, with some requiring to purge an entire arm to use, and can only be used once per mission/match. Usage of "OVERED Weapons", when activated, are dictated via a timer that shows the limits of the AC's equipped generator unit, which was temporarily relieved of all restraints, enabling brief unlimited usage of all Core and Booster functions. The other feature implemented in the game is the ability to freely switch between the player AC's "modes": "Scanning Mode", which allows players to collect information from their surroundings while conserving energy, including enemy units and ACs, as well as providing mission waypoints; and the default "Combat Mode", allowing players to engage in combat with enemy units and ACs using a variety of weapons, while unable to regain energy through combat.

The online mode features five-on-five team-based battles, with each side battling over specific objectives across the map. One member of each team is designated as the Operator and must oversee the entire battle and issue orders to their team.

A curiosity about the game is that, according to the producer Toshifumi Nabeshima, the player should hold the controller (PS3 and Xbox 360) in a special way as the ideal to effectively control ACs. According to information from the game itself, this way of playing is called “densetsu no AC mochi” (伝説のAC持ち) in Japanese, which means the “legendary Armored Core grip”.

The online servers for Armored Core V were shut down on March 20, 2014.

Story
In a distant futuristic, post-apocalyptic world, people gathered in a few survivable areas. Among them, "City", which is relatively large, was oppressed by a person called the Father and his enigmatic organization called The Corporation. At one point, a man who was an aide to the Father was banished to the underground world. The man united the people of the underground world to form the Resistance organization. They carried out an all out counter-offensive war operation to break the tyrannical rule of the Father. However, the operation failed because it was detected in advance, and the man also died. A year later, the Resistance relaunched under a new leader.

Release
The game was released in Japan on January 26, 2012 for both PlayStation 3 and Xbox 360. The game was released by Namco Bandai Games on March 20 in North America, March 22 in Australia, and March 23, 2012, in Europe.

FromSoftware has released a companion application for iOS and Android devices which provides access to a database of in-game parts and weapons to aid in mech customization.

Reception

The game received "mixed or average reviews" on both platforms according to the review aggregation website Metacritic. In Japan, Famitsu gave it a score of one nine, two eights, and one nine for a total of 34 out of 40.

The Daily Telegraph gave the Xbox 360 version four stars out of five and said it was "a brilliant game that is nonetheless difficult to recommend to everyone", but that "those with an eye for detail and a fair amount of patience will be rewarded with a deep, engaging and entirely idiosyncratic experience. Just don't go in expecting your hand to be held at any point". The Digital Fix gave the PlayStation 3 version seven out of ten and said it was "a very sterile and cold experience" without its multiplayer approach. Metro likewise gave it seven out of ten and said it was "still not the game that will make giant robot sims mainstream, but it does have some innovative ideas in terms of both combat and online play". The Observer gave the game a mixed review and said that it "looks fantastic and is thoroughly entertaining, but its impenetrability may prove too much for all but the faithful".

References

External links
 Official website
 

2012 video games
Armored Core
Video games about mecha
Bandai Namco games
PlayStation 3 games
Third-person shooters
Video game sequels
Xbox 360 games
Multiplayer and single-player video games
Video games developed in Japan
Video games scored by Kota Hoshino
Video games set in the future